Harpreet Singh Giani is an Indian-born lawyer based in London, England.

Biography
Harpreet Singh Giani was born in India into a Punjabi Sikh family. He was born to an eminent lawyer Harinder Singh Giani from Chandigarh and the grandson of the Sikh scholar and calligraphist, Pratap Singh Giani.

Giani completed his initial education from the DAV College, Chandigarh. He then obtained a Bachelor's degree in Law from Panjab University at Chandigarh, and was admitted to the bar in 1999. After practicing for a few years, he chose to pursue further studies and earned a Master of Business Laws degree from the National Law School of India University, Bangalore (2004). He then took up Master of Laws (International Law) from the London School of Economics (2006). Immediately after taking the latter degree, he was called to the bar of England and Wales in 2006 at Gray's Inn. Thus, he is one of the handful of lawyers enjoying the rights of audience in all courts in India (as an advocate) as well as in England & Wales (as a barrister). In India, he is in independent practice in Chandigarh and in England & Wales, he practices from Libertas Chambers.

Giani is also an alumnus of the Hague Academy of International Law (2003) and the International Institute of Higher Studies in Criminal Sciences, Siracusa, Italy (2008) where he studied Shariat (Islamic) law. He was also the first-ever Indian to intern in the International Criminal Court at The Hague. In 2017, he was a Ph.D. candidate at the Indian Law Institute, New Delhi and researched the legality, availability, genesis and the application of the death penalty in India.

On 5 December 2014 Giani was admitted into the Freedom of the City of London

Publications
 Books
 The Blood Bankers' Legal Handbook (2003)
 Newspaper Columns
 Byte by Byte, Weekly Column in the Indian Express, 1994–1998
 Newspaper Op-Eds
 Dispensing Justice- Lawyers to blame for judicial mess.
 Different strokes - Curious stance against French secular initiative.
 The right to be born - State must take care of its citizens.
 Why court cases pile up - Giving stay orders as a routine is to blame.
 Whither rule of law? - Each acquittal is a blot.

Controversy 

The Liberhan Commission was appointed by the Government of India in December 1992 to inquire into the circumstances surrounding the demolition of the Babri Masjid earlier the same month. Six years after the commission was formed, Giani accepted the responsibility of serving as the Commission's Counsel. He joined the Commission in 1998, after the previous Counsel had resigned. Giani worked on the final report which was handed over to the Indian Prime Minister Manmohan Singh and Home Minister P. Chidambaram by Justice Liberhan and Giani. A further 11 years later, on 30 June 2009. Giani remained the Commission's Counsel for over a year and a half, till the Commission was wound up with the submission of the report.

In the parliamentary debate in the lower house of the Indian Parliament, Members of Parliament Pinaki Mishra and Sushma Swaraj stated that they believed that the report had in fact been written by Giani rather than Chief Justice Manmohan Singh Liberhan. In the upper house of parliament, Member of Parliament Arun Jaitley similarly claimed  that

Notes

External links
 Harpreet Singh Giani joins 33 Chancery Lane
 Professional bio

Year of birth missing (living people)
Living people
Members of Gray's Inn
Panjab University alumni
Alumni of the London School of Economics
20th-century British lawyers
British people of Punjabi descent